The acetolactate synthase (ALS) enzyme (also known as acetohydroxy acid or acetohydroxyacid synthase, abbr. AHAS) is a protein found in plants and micro-organisms.  ALS catalyzes the first step in the synthesis of the branched-chain amino acids (valine, leucine, and isoleucine).

A human protein of yet unknown function, sharing some sequence similarity with bacterial ALS, is encoded by the ILVBL (ilvB-like) gene.

Structure

Gene
Human ILVBL gene has 17 exons resides on chromosome 19 at q13.1.

Protein
The catalytic peptide of ALS in Arabidopsis thaliana (mouse-eared cress) is a chloroplastic protein consisting of 670 residues, the last 615 of which form the active form. Three main domains are found, with two thiamine pyrophosphate sandwiching a DHS-like NAD/FAD-binding domain. In SCOP assignment, these subunits are named d1yhya1, d1yhya2, and d1yhya3 from the N-terminal to the C-termianl.

The structure of acetolactate synthase that was used for the picture on this page was determined using X-ray diffraction at 2.70 angstroms. X-ray diffraction uses X-rays at specified wavelengths to produce patterns, as the X–ray is scattered in certain ways that give an idea to the structure of the molecule being analyzed.

There are five specific ligands that interact with this protein. The five are listed below.

The FAD bound is not catalytic.

Function 

Acetolactate synthase is catalytic enzyme involved in the biosynthesis of various amino acids. This enzyme has the Enzyme Commission Code is 2.2.1.6, which means that the enzyme is a transketolase or a transaldolase, which is classified under the transferases that transfer aldehyde or ketone residues. In this case, acetolactate synthase is a transketolase, which moves back and forth, having both catabolic and anabolic forms. These act on a ketone (pyruvate) and can go back and forth in the metabolic chain. These are found in humans, animals, plants, and bacteria. In plants, they are located in the chloroplasts in order to help with the metabolic processes. In baker's yeast, they are located in the mitochondria. In several experiments, it has been shown that mutated strains of Escherichia coli K-12 without the enzyme were not able to grow in the presence of only acetate or oleate as the only carbon sources.

A catabolic version that does not bind FAD is found in some bacteria.

Catalytic activity

Acetolactate synthase, also known as acetohydroxy acid synthase, is an enzyme specifically involved in the conversion of pyruvate to acetolactate:

 2 CH3COCO2− → −O2CC(OH)(CH3)COCH3 + CO2

The reaction uses thiamine pyrophosphate in order to link the two pyruvate molecules. The resulting product of this reaction, acetolactate, eventually becomes valine, leucine, and isoleucine. All three of these amino acids are essential amino acids and cannot be synthesized by humans. This also leads to the systemic name pyruvate:pyruvate acetaldehydetransferase (decarboxylating).
This enzyme is the first of several enzymes in the biosynthesis cycle for leucine and valine, taking the initial pyruvate molecules and starting the conversion from pyruvic acid to the amino acids. The specific residue that is responsible for this is a glycine at position 511 in the protein. This is the one that requires a cofactor of TPP for its function.

Four specific residues are responsible for catalytic activity in this enzyme. They are listed here with cofactors required written after.

The primary sequence of this protein in Mouse-ear cress is listed below. Residues involved in catalytic activity are bolded. 
Mutagenesis of Asp428, which is crucial carboxylate ligand to Mg(2+) in the "ThDP motif", leads to a decrease in the affinity of AHAS II for Mg(2+). While mutant D428N shows ThDP affinity close to that of the wild-type on saturation with Mg(2+), D428E has a decreased affinity for ThDP. These mutations also lead to dependence of the enzyme on K(+).

Because of inhibition and several factors it is a slow procedure.

Regulation
In the mouse-eared cress, two chains of catalytic ALS is complexed with two regulatory small subunits, VAT1 and At2g31810. Such an arrangement is widespread in both bacterial and eukaryotic ALS. The hetromeric structure was demonstrated in E. coli in 1984 and in eukaryotes (S. cerevisiae and Porphyra purpurea) in 1997. Most of the regulatory proteins have an ACT domain and some of them have a NiKR-like C-terminal.

In bacteria (E. coli)), Acetolactate synthase consists of three pairs of isoforms. Each pair includes a large subunit, which is thought to be responsible for catalysis, and a small subunit for feedback inhibition. Each subunit pair, or ALS I, II, and III respectively, is located on its own operon, ilvBN, ilvGM and ilvIH (where ilvN regulated ilvB, and vice versa). Together, these operons code for several enzymes involved in branched-chain amino acid biosynthesis. Regulation is different for each operon.

The ilvGMEDA operon encodes the ilvGM (ALS II) pair as well as a branched-chain-amino-acid transaminase (ilvE), dihydroxy-acid dehydratase (ilvD), and threonine ammonia-lyase (ilvA). It is regulated by feedback inhibition in the form of transcriptional attenuation. That is, transcription is reduced in the presence of the pathway's end-products, the branched-chain amino acids.

The ilvBNC operon encodes the ilvBN (ALS I) pair and a ketol-acid reductoisomerase (ilvC). It is similarly regulated, but is specific to isoleucine and leucine; valine does not affect it directly.

Both the ilvGMEDA and ilvBNC operons are derepressed during shortages of the branched-chain amino acids by the same mechanism that represses them. Both of these operons as well as the third, ilvIH, are regulated by leucine-responsive protein (Lrp).

Inhibitors
Inhibitors of ALS are used as herbicides that slowly starve affected plants of these amino acids, which eventually leads to inhibition of DNA synthesis.  They affect grasses and dicots alike. They are not a chemistry class but rather mechanism class with diverse chemistries. The ALS inhibitor family includes sulfonylureas (SUs), imidazolinones, triazolopyrimidines (see :Category:Triazolopyrimidines), pyrimidinyl oxybenzoates, and sulfonylamino carbonyl triazolinones. , the ALS inhibitors suffer the worst (known) resistance problem of all herbicide classes, having 169 known resistant target species. The structures of ALS herbicides are radically different from the normal substrate and so none of them bind at the catalytic site but instead at a site specific to herbicidal action. Therefore resistance mutations are expected to have widely varying effects on normal ALS catalysis activity, positive, negative and neutral. Unsurprisingly that is exactly what experiments have shown, including Yu et al., 2007 finding resistance in Hordeum murinum due to a proline→serine substitution at amino acid 197 to increase ALS activity by 2x-3x.

Clinical significance
CADASIL, an identified autosomal dominant condition characterized by the recurrence of subcortical infarcts leading to dementia, was previously mapped to “ILVBL” gene within a 2-cM interval, D19S226–D19S199. This gene encodes a protein highly similar to the acetolactate synthase of other organisms. No recombination event was observed with D19S841, a highly polymorphic microsatellite marker isolated from a cosmid mapped to this region. No mutation was detected on this gene in CADASIL patients, suggesting that it is not implicated in this disorder.

Interactions 
In the study of Escherichia coli, the FAD binding domain of ilvB has been shown to interact with ilvN and activate the AHAS I enzyme.

References

External links 
 
 Ramachandran plot 
 

EC 2.2.1